Muhammad Rizwan (born 25 November 1991), known as Muhammad Rizwan Jr., is a Pakistani field hockey player who plays as a midfielder for the Pakistan national team.

He was included in the squad for the 2012 Olympic Games in London, UK.

Rizwan now plays his club hockey for Khalsa Leamington in the England hockey National league.

See also
Muhammad Rizwan Sr. (born 1989)

References

External links

1991 births
Living people
Pakistani male field hockey players
2010 Men's Hockey World Cup players
Field hockey players at the 2012 Summer Olympics
Field hockey players at the 2014 Asian Games
Olympic field hockey players of Pakistan
Asian Games medalists in field hockey
Male field hockey midfielders
Asian Games silver medalists for Pakistan
Medalists at the 2014 Asian Games